Anton Dahl (19 December 1882 – 3 November 1952) was a Norwegian sports shooter. He competed in the 300m military rifle event at the 1920 Summer Olympics.

References

External links
 

1882 births
1952 deaths
People from Namsos
Norwegian male sport shooters
Olympic shooters of Norway
Shooters at the 1920 Summer Olympics
Sportspeople from Trøndelag
20th-century Norwegian people